Daniel Joseph "Dan" Davies (born December 25, 1965) is an American actor, screenplay writer and producer who wrote, co-produced and starred in the 2010 comedy film Ed Gein, the Musical, about the cannibalistic murderer and graverobber, Ed Gein.

Early life
Davies was born in Milwaukee, Wisconsin. He attended Waupaca High School in Waupaca, Wisconsin and he graduated from the University of Wisconsin-La Crosse with a B.A. in Political Science and English. Davies claims Irish, Welsh and American Indian heritage.

Career
In 1997, he wrote and hosted the instructional video, The Games We Used to Play.

In 2010 he wrote, co-produced and played the title character in Ed Gein, The Musical, a micro-budget horror/musical/comedy film.

Davies co-wrote the screenplay for, and acts in the film, West of Thunder. He co-starred with Sadie Kaye in Miss Adventure meets Motörhead, which was a highly rated video on Will Ferrell/HBO's Funny or Die. He was part of an ensemble cast in the British Independent Film Award (BIFA) nominated mockumentary feature film "Flim, the Movie". He played the role of Scorpion alongside the Nollywood actor Ramsey Nouah in the Hollywood/Nollywood collaboration, Tempting Fate (2015 film). It premiered at the Pan African Film Festival in 2015 and is a Dove Foundation Award-winning film.

Davies also co-starred with Ayo Makun, Funke Akindele, Nse Ikpe-Etim and Eric Roberts in the Nollywood/Hollywood comedy A Trip to Jamaica that was released in September, 2016. This film also premiered in London in Dec 2016 and held the highest per-screen average in the UK during its box office run. The film has been nominated in 5 categories for the Africa Magic Viewers Choice Awards 2017. It also has been nominated for a 2017 African Academy Award (Best Comedy)   It was the No. 1 Nollywood box office film of 2016, and, as of December 2016, became the No. 1 Nollywood box office film of all time. He was nominated for Best Supporting Actor (Comedy) along with Majid Michel and John Dumelo in the 2017 Golden Movie Awards for his work in A Trip to Jamaica. He won the award July 22. The award ceremonies were televised on the African Movie Channel throughout Africa as well as the UK, Germany, France and The Netherlands.

In 2017 he appeared in the revenge thriller Wronged and the psychological thriller/horror Mr. Thursday.

References 

1965 births
Male actors from Milwaukee
Living people
Writers from Milwaukee
University of Wisconsin–La Crosse alumni
American male film actors
21st-century American male actors